Ahora y Siempre (Eng.: Now and Forever) is a studio album released by music group Alacranes Musical. This album became their first number-one set on the Billboard Top Latin Albums, and was released in a standard CD presentation and as a Deluxe Edition CD/DVD combo.

Track listing
The track listing from Billboard and Allmusic.

CD

Deluxe edition
On February 12, 2008 a Deluxe edition of this album was released, including the same track listing and a bonus DVD with 4 music videos.

Chart performance

Year-End charts

Sales and certifications

References

2007 albums
Alacranes Musical albums
Spanish-language albums